Minha vida de trás pra frente is an autobiographical book published by writer, radio personality and internet celebrity Selma Sueli Silva.

Book's Overview 
In Minha Vida de Trás pra Frente, Silva, who was only diagnosed with the autistic spectrum at the age of 53, recalls her personal and professional career in communication from the critical point of view that she discovered herself to be autistic in adulthood. The book is based on the diaries that the protagonist kept throughout her life. In addition, it addresses aspects of childhood, such as the fact that she preferred to play with objects that made her more comfortable and in control than with other children.

Thus, she retraces her trajectory based on the discovery, and realizes that the signs of autism have always been present. She compares Sueli, as she was known during her childhood and adolescence and lived in communities afraid of displeasing due to her naivety and a non-standard personality, with Selma on the radio, who stood out for her professional safety and humanist ideals. In this way, the author portrays the different faces of her persona that constitute her inside and outside the radio and audiovisual production studios.

As well as other books by Selma Sueli Silva, Minha vida de trás pra frente has become a reference for studies on autism in adult women. She continued to address the theme in books such as Camaleônicos and Autismo no Feminino.

References 

2017 non-fiction books
Brazilian non-fiction books
Books about autism
Books about autistic women